The men's 100 metres competition at the 2018 Asian Games took place on 25 and 26 August 2018 at the Gelora Bung Karno Stadium.

Schedule
All times are Western Indonesia Time (UTC+07:00)

Records

Results

Round 1
 Qualification: First 4 in each heat (Q) and the next 4 fastest (q) advance to the semifinals.

Heat 1
 Wind: −0.1 m/s

Heat 2
 Wind: +0.6 m/s

Heat 3
 Wind: 0.0 m/s

Heat 4
 Wind: −0.6 m/s

Heat 5
 Wind: +0.7 m/s

Semifinals
 Qualification: First 2 in each heat (Q) and the next 2 fastest (q) advance to the final.

Heat 1 
 Wind: −0.2 m/s

Heat 2 
 Wind: +0.2 m/s

Heat 3 
 Wind: +0.9 m/s

Final 
 Wind: +0.8 m/s

References

External links
Results

Men's 100 metres
2018